Q-Flex is a type of ship, specifically a membrane type liquefied natural gas carrier.

Technical description
Q-Flex vessels are propelled by two slow speed diesel engines, which are claimed to be more efficient and environmentally friendly than traditional steam turbines.  Q-Flex carriers are equipped with an on-board re-liquefaction system to handle the boil-off gas, liquefy it and return the LNG to the cargo tanks. The on-board re-liquefaction system reduces LNG losses, which produces economic and environmental benefits. Overall, it is estimated that Q-Flex carriers have about 40% lower energy requirements and carbon emissions than conventional LNG carriers.

The capacity of a Q-Flex vessel is between 165,000 m3 and 216,000 m3. Until the entry into service of the Q-Max-type carrier, it was the world's largest LNG carrier type with a capacity of 1.5 times that of conventional LNG carriers.

Contractors
The first Q-Flex LNG carrier was delivered by Hyundai Heavy Industries in late 2007. The installed re-liquefaction system is developed and delivered by Hamworthy and approved and certified by DNV.  Q-Flex LNG carriers are built also by Daewoo Shipbuilding & Marine Engineering Company and Samsung Heavy Industries.

Ships
As of 2022 there are 31 named Q-Flex LNG carriers in service.
  All these vessels are owned by holding companies established by the Qatar Gas Transport Company (Nakilat) and different shipping companies such as Pronav, MOL, K-Line, Teekay and NYK and they are chartered to Qatar's LNG producers Qatargas.

References

Natural gas
Ship types